Badingen is a village and a former municipality in the district of Stendal, in Saxony-Anhalt, Germany. Since 1 January 2010, it is part of the town Bismark. Badingen observes Central European Time.

History 
Badingen first appeared in 980 in a document as Waddigo.

On 30 September 1928, the Gutsbezirk Badingen was united with the rural community Badingen.

References 

Former municipalities in Saxony-Anhalt
Bismark, Germany